Captain Alexander Fraser of the 34th Regiment, a veteran of the French and Indian War, commanded what became known as the Company of Select Marksmen during the Burgoyne campaign in 1777.

The Marksmen, sometimes known as Rangers, were to consist of two good men from each company of the regiments then in Canada (9th, 20th, 21st, 24th, 31st, 34th, 47th, 53rd and 62nd) excluding the 8th (or King's) Regiment. This company, acting as scouts and light infantry under Capt Fraser did much good work participating in the battles of Hubbardton, Bennington and Saratoga. Capt Fraser either escaped or was one of four British officers to be given passports from Saratoga with General Burgoyne's papers, returning to Fort Ticonderoga and Quebec with news of the defeat. Alexander Fraser continued fighting and raiding throughout the American Revolutionary War and afterwards eventually becoming the commanding officer of the 45th (or Nottinghamshire) Regiment in 1795.

The Revolutionary War re-enactment unit 'Company of Select Marksmen' portray members of the 34th and other member units with their women, children and native allies.

Ad hoc units and formations of the British Army
Military units and formations of Great Britain in the American Revolutionary War